Bill Haley (? – ?) was an English footballer who played as a half-back. He made 101 appearances in all competitions and scored 54 times for Fulham.

English footballers
Fulham F.C. players
English Football League players
Association football midfielders